In mathematical logic, a universal quantification is a type of quantifier, a logical constant which is interpreted as "given any" or "for all". It expresses that a predicate can be satisfied by every member of a domain of discourse. In other words, it is the predication of a property or relation to every member of the domain. It asserts that a predicate within the scope of a universal quantifier is true of every value of a predicate variable.

It is usually denoted by the turned A (∀) logical operator symbol, which, when used together with a predicate variable, is called a universal quantifier ("", "", or sometimes by "" alone). Universal quantification is distinct from existential quantification ("there exists"), which only asserts that the property or relation holds for at least one member of the domain.

Quantification in general is covered in the article on quantification (logic).

Basics 
Suppose it is given that
This would seem to be a logical conjunction because of the repeated use of "and". However, the "etc." cannot be interpreted as a conjunction in formal logic. Instead, the statement must be rephrased:
For all natural numbers n, one has 2·n = n + n.
This is a single statement using universal quantification.

This statement can be said to be more precise than the original one. While the "etc." informally includes natural numbers, and nothing more, this was not rigorously given. In the universal quantification, on the other hand, the natural numbers are mentioned explicitly.

This particular example is true, because any natural number could be substituted for n and the statement "2·n = n + n" would be true. In contrast,
For all natural numbers n, one has 2·n > 2 + n
is false, because if n is substituted with, for instance, 1, the statement "2·1 > 2 + 1" is false. It is immaterial that "2·n > 2 + n" is true for most natural numbers n: even the existence of a single counterexample is enough to prove the universal quantification false.

On the other hand,
for all composite numbers n, one has 2·n > 2 + n
is true, because none of the counterexamples are composite numbers. This indicates the importance of the domain of discourse, which specifies which values n can take. In particular, note that if the domain of discourse is restricted to consist only of those objects that satisfy a certain predicate, then for universal quantification this requires a logical conditional. For example,
For all composite numbers n, one has 2·n > 2 + n
is logically equivalent to
For all natural numbers n, if n is composite, then 2·n > 2 + n.
Here the "if ... then" construction indicates the logical conditional.

Notation 
In symbolic logic, the universal quantifier symbol  (a turned "A" in a sans-serif font, Unicode U+2200) is used to indicate universal quantification. It was first used in this way by Gerhard Gentzen in 1935, by analogy with Giuseppe Peano's  (turned E) notation for existential quantification and the later use of Peano's notation by Bertrand Russell.

For example, if P(n) is the predicate "2·n > 2 + n" and N is the set of natural numbers, then
 
is the (false) statement
"for all natural numbers n, one has 2·n > 2 + n".

Similarly, if Q(n) is the predicate "n is composite", then
 
is the (true) statement
"for all natural numbers n, if n is composite, then ".

Several variations in the notation for quantification (which apply to all forms) can be found in the Quantifier article.

Properties

Negation 
The negation of a universally quantified function is obtained by changing the universal quantifier into an existential quantifier and negating the quantified formula. That is, 

where  denotes negation.

For example, if  is the propositional function " is married", then, for the set  of all living human beings, the universal quantification
Given any living person , that person is married
is written

This statement is false. Truthfully, it is stated that
It is not the case that, given any living person , that person is married
or, symbolically:
.

It is erroneous to confuse "all persons are not married" (i.e. "there exists no person who is married") with "not all persons are married" (i.e. "there exists a person who is not married"):

Other connectives 
The universal (and existential) quantifier moves unchanged across the logical connectives ∧, ∨, →, and ↚, as long as the other operand is not affected; that is:

Conversely, for the logical connectives ↑, ↓, ↛, and ←, the quantifiers flip:

Rules of inference 

A rule of inference is a rule justifying a logical step from hypothesis to conclusion.  There are several rules of inference which utilize the universal quantifier.

Universal instantiation concludes that, if the propositional function is known to be universally true, then it must be true for any arbitrary element of the universe of discourse.  Symbolically, this is represented as

where c is a completely arbitrary element of the universe of discourse.

Universal generalization concludes the propositional function must be universally true if it is true for any arbitrary element of the universe of discourse.  Symbolically, for an arbitrary c,

The element c must be completely arbitrary; else, the logic does not follow: if c is not arbitrary, and is instead a specific element of the universe of discourse, then P(c) only implies an existential quantification of the propositional function.

The empty set 

By convention, the formula  is always true, regardless of the formula P(x); see vacuous truth.

Universal closure 

The universal closure of a formula φ is the formula with no free variables obtained by adding a universal quantifier for every free variable in φ. For example, the universal closure of

is
.

As adjoint 
In category theory and the theory of elementary topoi, the universal quantifier can be understood as the right adjoint of a functor between power sets, the inverse image functor of a function between sets; likewise, the existential quantifier is the left adjoint.

For a set , let  denote its powerset. The left adjoint of this functor is the existential quantifier  and the right adjoint is the universal quantifier .

That is,  is a functor that, for each subset , gives the subset  given by

those  in the image of  under .  Similarly, the universal quantifier  is a functor that, for each subset , gives the subset  given by

The more familiar form of the quantifiers as used in first-order logic is obtained by taking the function f to be the unique function  so that  is the two-element set holding the values true and false, a subset S is that subset for which the predicate  holds, and

which is true if  is not empty, and

which is false if S is not X.

The universal and existential quantifiers given above generalize to the presheaf category.

See also 
 Existential quantification
 First-order logic
 List of logic symbols—for the Unicode symbol ∀

Notes

References 

 (ch. 2)

External links 
 

Logic symbols
Logical expressions
Quantifier (logic)